Sjo Soons (28 August 1898 – 15 September 1964) was a Dutch footballer. He played in one match for the Netherlands national football team in 1922.

References

External links
 

1898 births
1964 deaths
Dutch footballers
Netherlands international footballers
Place of birth missing
Association footballers not categorized by position